Regions Plaza may refer to:

Regions Plaza (Atlanta, Georgia)
Regions Plaza (Jackson, Mississippi)